Discovery Life is an American cable television network owned by Warner Bros. Discovery. Launched on February 1, 2011 as Discovery Fit & Health, it was the result of the merger of Discovery Health Channel and FitTV (following the former's replacement in its channel space by OWN), and focuses on reality programming dealing with "life events". Its programming is drawn from the libraries of its predecessors and TLC.

As of February 2015, approximately 46,696,000 American households (40.1% of households with television) received Discovery Life.

History 
On January 17, 2011, Discovery Communications announced that FitTV would be re-launched as Discovery Fit & Health on February 1, 2011. Its formation was the result of Discovery Health's replacement with the Oprah Winfrey Network (OWN) at the beginning of the year; the company noted that Discovery Health's programming still had loyal viewership, even as the network was being wound down in favor of OWN. Initially, the channel's programming was similar to what was being carried by Discovery Health, but with a fitness-oriented block in the morning featuring FitTV programs.

As Discovery Life

On January 15, 2015, the channel was re-branded as Discovery Life. The rebranding was meant to reflect a broadening of the network's concept targeting women aged 25–54, focusing upon life events and "the drama inherent in our everyday lives".

Programming 
The majority of the network's schedule consists of library programs (including series and specials) from TLC. Programs span the topics of medical emergencies (Untold Stories of the ER, Mystery Diagnosis), addiction and mental illness (Cracking Addiction, Hoarding: Buried Alive), pregnancy and childbirth (A Baby Story, Outrageous Births: Tales from the Crib), and sex (Sex Sent Me to the ER).

 50 Ways to Kill Your Mother
 A Baby Story
 Addicted
 An Hour to Save Your Life
 Anonymous: Inside the Meeting
 Baby Week
 Birth Day
 Bizarre ER
 Body Bizarre
 Born Schizophrenic
 Boston EMS
 Boston Med
 Cracking Addiction
 Critically Real
 Detroit ER
 Diagnose Me
 Diagnosis: Dead or Alive
 Discovery Life Presents
 Dr. G: Medical Examiner
 Emergency
 Emergency 24/7
 Emergency Level One
 ER Files
 Exposed: My Naked Truth
 Facing Trauma with Dr. Andrew A. Jacono
 Faking It
 Fat Chance
 Funeral Boss
 Gimme Mo
 High School Moms
 Hoarding: Behind Closed Doors
 Hoarding: Buried Alive
 I Didn't Know I Was Pregnant
 I'm Pregnant and...
 In an Instant
 Maternity Ward
 My 600-lb Life
 My Mom is Obsessed
 Mystery Diagnosis
 New Girls on the Block
 NY ER
 Outrageous Births: Tales from the Crib
 Save My Life: Boston Trauma
 Secret Sex Lives: Swingers
 Secretly Pregnant
 Sex in Public
 Sex Sent Me to the ER
 Shock Trauma: Edge of Life
 Shocking Family Secrets
 Sin City ER
 Skin Tight
 Sydney ER
 The Day I Almost Died
 The Girl with Half a Face 
 The Mistress
 Those Girls
 Trauma Doctors
 Trauma: Life in the E.R.
 Trauma: Seconds to Live
 Untold Stories of the ER
 Vegas ER
 World's Worst Mom

References 

Warner Bros. Discovery networks
Television channels and stations established in 2011
English-language television stations in the United States